Caporaso is a surname. Notable people with the surname include:

Elena Gatti Caporaso (1918–1999), Italian socialist politician and feminist
Lucia Caporaso (born 1965), Italian mathematician
Luciana (singer) (born 1973), English singer 
Teodorico Caporaso (born 1987), Italian racewalker